The Ximoko Party is a minor political party in South Africa. It has no representation in the National Assembly or the provincial legislatures, but currently has 3 councillors at municipal level in Limpopo province as of 2019.

History 
Formed as a cultural organisation in 1984 by Hudson Ntsanwisi, then prime minister of the Gazankulu bantustan, Ximoko transformed into a political party in 1990, still under Ntsanwisi's leadership.

After his death in 1993, some members of the party formed an alliance with the African National Congress (ANC), while others continued as the Ximoko Democratic Party, and contested the 1994 elections, still registered as the Ximoko Progressive Party. The party won no seats.

In 1996, the party reformed as the Ximoko Party and contested the 1999 elections in the then Northern Province (now Limpopo) only, again winning no seats. It has since only contested in Limpopo, failing to win any seats each time.

The party has also competed for a number of local government positions.

Election results

National elections 

|- style="background:#ccc;"
!Election
!Votes
!%
!Seats
|-
| 1994
| style="text-align:right;"| 6,320
| style="text-align:right;"| 0.03
| style="text-align:right;"| 0
|}

Provincial elections 

|----- bgcolor="#cccccc"
!rowspan="2"|Election
!colspan="2" |Limpopo
|-
|----- bgcolor="#cccccc"
|align="center"|%
|Seats
|-
|1994
| align="right"|0.10%
| align="right"|0/49
|-
|1999
| align="right"|0.80%
| align="right"|0/49
|-
|2004
| align="right"|0.59%
| align="right"|0/49
|-
|2009
| align="right"|0.23%
| align="right"|0/49
|-
|2014
| align="right"|0.21%
| align="right"|0/49
|-
|2019
| align="right"|0.08%
| align="right"|0/49
|-
|}

Municipal elections

|-
! Election
! Votes
! %
|-
! 2016
| 7,556
| 0.02%
|-
! 2021
| 4,835
| 0.02%
|-
|}

References

Political parties in South Africa
Political parties established in 1984
QwaQwa